Tomás Bobadilla y Briones (30 March 1785 – 21 December 1871) was a writer, intellectual and politician from the Dominican Republic. The first ruler of the Dominican Republic, he had a significant participation in the movement for Dominican independence.

Biography 
He was born in Neiba on 30 March 1785, son of Vicente Bobadilla Amaral, and Gregoria Justina Briones Pérez. He devoted to the political life and the writing.

In 1810, when he reached the age of majority in force at that time (25 years of age), Bobadilla obtained his certification of Blood Purity, as all of both his paternal grandparents and maternal great-grandparents had been born in Europe, this certificate allowed him access to high public offices of the colonial administration, reserved to white Dominicans and Peninsulars.

From the period known as España Boba or "Meek Spain", he occupied very important positions. He was fellow of José Núñez de Cáceres y Albor and participated in politics during the Ephemeral Independence.

Bobadilla exerted the position of Public Scribe in 1811, and afterwards, he became Greater Notary of the Archbishop Pedro Valera y Jiménez.

During the ephemeral Independence, proclaimed by Núñez de Cáceres in late 1821, Bobadilla occupied the office of First Official of the General Treasury of the State, a few months before the Haitian annexation. Afterwards, in 1830, he was appointed public defender and notary of Santo Domingo, in 1831.

On 12 May 1832, he married in Santo Domingo to María Virginia Desmier D’Olbreuse y Allard, descendant of French colonists of noble origin from the House of Desmier-Olbreuse. They had 5 children born out of wedlock: María del Carmen Leonor (b. 1823), María Vicenta (b. 1824), Gerardo (b. 1827), Carlos Tomás (b. 1830), José María (b. 1830); they had a daughter after their wedding: Clemencia Antonia (who was the mother of Adolfo Alejandro Nouel).

Upon learning the plans of the Trinitarians on Independence, he was lured to the independence movement. Bobadilla attracted a lot of people so they join of the pro-independence activities. He is considered  the author of the Manifesto of January 16, 1844, the act of Independence of the Dominican Republic. On the night of 27 February 1844, Bobadilla was present in the Count’s Gate.

He participated in the events of 27 February 1844, beside Francisco del Rosario Sánchez and Matías Ramón Mella.

After the initial fighting, liberal Trinitarians and conservative Frenchifieds begun the organisation of the Dominican State on 1 March 1844; they established a cabinet called the "Central Gubernative Junta" and chose Bobadilla as President.

Because of his ideas to annexate the newly independent state of Santo Domingo to France or achieve a French protectorate, President Bobadilla was deposed on 9 June 1844, by a coup d’état by Trinitarian patriots headed by Sánchez and Mella. General Pedro Santana contested the coup d’état, with a counter-coup, getting himself appointed as president and appointing Bobadilla as a member of the Junta.

From 1844 to 1847, Bobadilla occupied important offices inside the State, such as President of Chamber of Deputies of the Dominican Republic in 1847., until being sent to the exile on 12 June 1847, by President Santana.

He returned to the country in 1849 and was chosen member of the Chamber of the Conservative Council, Prosecutor in the Supreme Court of Justice and, finally, Judge of Residence for the Court of Appeal.

Bobadilla won again the preference of Santana, and was appointed Procusecutor of the Supreme Court of Justice in 1851, and Plenipotentiary minister for Negotiation and Extradition with the United States of North America.

He served as Chairman of the Supreme Court of Justice, from 3 June 1851, until 17 January 1853; afterwards, from 1853 until 1859, period of the governments of Rule Mota, Desiderio Valverde, Buenaventura Báez and Pedro Santana, he held important offices. He was the president of the Senate of the Dominican Republic in 1854.

During the re-annexation era to Spain (1861–1865), Bobadilla was designated Magistrate of the Royal Audience of Santo Domingo.

After the Restoration of the Independence (1865), Bobadilla was appointed, at a very advanced age, by the Triumvirate as Member of The Auxiliary Board of the Government. Also and still in spite of his very advanced age, they trusted him the review of the Criminal Code.

Finally, in 1867, Bobadilla was appointed Plenipotentiary Minister for the negotiation of a treaty of peace with the Republic of Haiti. He held both the ministries of Home Affairs and Police and of Foreign Affairs.

In January 1868, Bobadilla went into exile for a second time, to settle in Puerto Rico in 1871, and afterwards in Port au Prince, Haiti, where he died alone at age 86. His widow was living in the Dominican Republic with their daughter Clemencia Antonia Bobadilla y Desmier D’Olbreuse and their son-in-law Carlos Rafael Nouel y Pierret, as she was tired of his repeated infidelities. Bobadilla’s remains were never found, so his remains have not been repatriated to  his homeland of the Dominican Republic.

References

1871 deaths
1785 births
Dominican Republic male writers
Dominican Republic people of Spanish descent
People of the Dominican War of Independence
Presidents of the Dominican Republic
Presidents of the Chamber of Deputies of the Dominican Republic
Presidents of the Senate of the Dominican Republic
Dominican Republic exiles
Dominican Republic expatriates in Haiti
Dominican Republic expatriates in Puerto Rico
Dominican Republic independence activists
White Dominicans